Ten Nights in a Barroom is an American film released in 1926. The film had a temperance theme and an African American cast. It followed on Timothy Shay Arthur's 1854 novel Ten Nights in a Bar-Room and What I Saw There and William W. Pratt's play, as well as earlier film adaptations (listed at Ten Nights in a Barroom) albeit with white casts. A man's drinking causes him to lose money, his business, and his daughter. The film has been restored and is archived at the Library of Congress. Charles Gilpin stars. The film was released during the Prohibition era. Roy Calnek directed.

The film is the second of four films released by Colored Players Film Corporation and one of two, along with The Scar of Shame, that remain in existence. The film was positively reviewed by critics.

Oscar Micheaux's film company was a rival and released films that competed with the newer film company's releases, in this case The Spider's Web, which was released a week after it debuted. The newer film company also poached actors from Micheaux including Chenault, and both firms claimed they had the greatest star.

Plot summary

Cast
 Charles Gilpin as Joe Morgan 
 Lawrence Chenault as Simon Slade
 Myra Burwell
 Harry Henderson (actor) as Judge's son
 William A. Clayton Jr. as Rival for Slade's daughter
 Ethel Smith (actor) as Slade's daughter
 Arline Mickey
 Edward Moore
 William Johnson
 Florence Kennedy

References

External links
 
 
 
 

1926 films
American silent feature films
African-American drama films
1920s American films
Silent American drama films
1920s English-language films
1926 drama films